Flirsch is a municipality in the Landeck district in Austrian state of Tyrol. It is located 11 km west of Landeck and 10 km east of Sankt Anton am Arlberg.

Although the area was previously settled, the village was mentioned for the first time in documents in 1275. The origin of the name lies in Rhaeto-Romance languages. Flirsch became an autonomous community in 1813.

References

External links
 
 

Cities and towns in Landeck District
Verwall Alps